Bennet Eickhoff (born 15 July 1995) is a German footballer who plays as a right back for Rot Weiss Ahlen.

References

External links
 

German footballers
Association football defenders
SC Preußen Münster players
Hammer SpVg players
TuS Haltern players
Rot Weiss Ahlen players
Regionalliga players
3. Liga players
1995 births
Living people